Emo is the tenth studio album by the American punk rock band Screeching Weasel. It was released on May 18, 1999 through Ben Weasel's and John Jughead's label Panic Button Records. It was their first full-length album released through Panic Button Records, recorded in Chicago during the blizzard of 1999. Although the title of the album is a tongue-in-cheek reference to the emo scene, the songwriting on the album is extremely emotional and confessional. Vocalist-lyricist Ben Weasel had used this style of songwriting many times on previous albums, but this marked a noticeable change in tone.

Track listing
All songs written by Ben Weasel, except "Linger" written by Noel Hogan and Dolores O'Riordan.

"Acknowledge" - 2:45
"Sidewalk Warrior" - 1:45
"Static" - 2:18
"The Scene" - 2:44
"Let Go" - 4:08
"Regroup" - 3:51
"Passion" - 2:05
"Linger" - 3:45
"Last Night" - 3:47
"2-7 Split" - 3:35
"On My Own" - 2:49
"Bark Like a Dog" - 5:07

Personnel
 Ben Weasel - lead vocals, guitar
 Jughead - guitar
 Mass Giorgini - bass
 Dan Lumley - drums

References

Screeching Weasel albums
1999 albums